The Trail County Courthouse in Hillsboro, North Dakota is a Beaux Arts building that was built in 1905.  It was designed by Buechner & Orth and has a tall domed tower.

In 1955 an International Style addition was built by architects Kurke Associates of Fargo.

It was listed on the National Register of Historic Places in 1980.

References

Beaux-Arts architecture in North Dakota
Government buildings completed in 1905
Courthouses on the National Register of Historic Places in North Dakota
County courthouses in North Dakota
National Register of Historic Places in Traill County, North Dakota
1905 establishments in North Dakota
Government buildings with domes